The Cottage Courts Historic District encompasses a historic travelers' accommodation at 609 Park Avenue in Hot Springs, Arkansas.  Built about 1950, it was one of the first motel-type tourist accommodations to be built in the city.  Unlike earlier tourist courts, which typically had idiosyncratic vernacular architecture, Cottage Courts consists of two ranch-style single-story buildings, one of which houses twelve guest rooms, and the other three plus the operator's apartment and office.

The property was listed on the National Register of Historic Places in 2004.

See also
National Register of Historic Places listings in Garland County, Arkansas

References

National Register of Historic Places in Hot Springs, Arkansas
Buildings and structures completed in 1950
Buildings and structures in Hot Springs, Arkansas
Historic districts on the National Register of Historic Places in Arkansas